Peter Lloyd (born 16 November 1920; died before 23 September 1976) was a British television sports commentator, who specialised in football commentaries. He is notable for having given, alongside former England captain Billy Wright, the first ever live television commentary on an English Football League match, when the second half of Blackpool versus Bolton Wanderers was shown by ITV on 10 September 1960.

Lloyd had previously worked for BBC Television, providing live commentary on various football games from 1948 until 1955. This included being the co-commentator on the FA Cup Final in both 1949 and 1950, and on coverage of England's matches against Scotland and Italy in April and November 1949, all alongside the BBC's main television football commentator of the time Jimmy Jewell.

Lloyd subsequently worked for the commercial ITV network following its launch in 1955, commentating for them on more than one FA Cup Final and on the 1958 World Cup. In the 1950s and 60s he also provided commentary for ITV on other sports such as figure skating and cricket, as well as on non-sporting events including royal wedding broadcasts in 1960 and 1961. Lloyd also worked as a presenter, fronting ITV's Seeing Sport. This was a programme aimed at younger viewers, later described by The Stage newspaper as having been "the only regular and popular sports programme" of the network's early years. By the time of the publication of that article in The Stage in September 1976, Lloyd had died.

In November 1958 he overpowered an intruder who had invaded a neighbour's house; the neighbour's 11-year-old son having run to Lloyd's home to ask for help.

References

English association football commentators
English sports broadcasters
1920 births
20th-century deaths
Year of death uncertain